Harrogate Convention Centre is a convention and exhibition centre in Harrogate, North Yorkshire, England.

History

Previously named Harrogate International Centre it was renamed Harrogate Convention Centre in April 2017. The centre has been described as being a "magnet for business conferences" and generates around £60 million per year into the local economy.

While Harrogate had been hosting conferences and exhibitions since the end of the Second World War, the 2,000-seat main auditorium opened in 1982 and was the host of the Eurovision Song Contest 1982. The venue has since expanded to include eight exhibition halls offering  of space as well as ancillary facilities including a hotel. Further expansion took place between 2009 and 2014.

The Royal Hall holds 1,000 people, whereas the Queen's Suite holds up to 600. The Royal Hall is grade II* listed building which is a former concert hall designed by Frank Matcham and Robert Beale.

The between April 2013 and December 2018, the director of the conference centre was Simon Kent. Since January 2019, the director is Paula Lorimer.

In April 2020, the centre was converted into an NHS Nightingale Hospital in response to the Coronavirus pandemic of 2020. The centre was furnished with 500 beds.

Notable events
The Liberal Democrats have held the Liberal Democrat Federal Conference at the centre on six occasions since the party's formation in 1988.

See also
 List of venues in the United Kingdom

References

External links

Harrogate Convention Centre website

Buildings and structures in Harrogate
Exhibition and conference centres in England
Commercial buildings completed in 1982
Event venues established in 1982
1982 establishments in England